Stephen Stetson (born January 24, 1951) is an American golf coach and former football player and coach.  He is the current head men's and women's golf coach at Hamilton College in Clinton, New York.  Stetson served as the head football coach at Hamilton from 1982 to 1984 and again from 2006 to 2011.  He was also the head football coach at Boston University  1985 to 1987 and Hartwick College from 1992 to 2001, compiling a career college football coaching record of 89–111–2. Stetson was a University of New Hampshire assistant football coach from 2002 to 2005.

Stetson grew up in Laconia, New Hampshire and was a three-sport standout at Laconia High School. He went on to become an All-Ivy League quarterback at Dartmouth College during his senior season in 1972.  In his three-year varsity career the Big Green went 24–2–1 with three straight Ivy League championships. Coach Stetson is now the offensive line coach at East Hamilton.

Head coaching record

Football

References

External links
 Hamilton golf profile

1951 births
Living people
American football quarterbacks
Boston University Terriers football coaches
Dartmouth Big Green football players
Hartwick Hawks football coaches
Hamilton Continentals football coaches
New Hampshire Wildcats football coaches
College golf coaches in the United States
People from Laconia, New Hampshire
Players of American football from New Hampshire